Shenzhen Guesthouse Hotel is a three star hotel in the Dongmen business district of Shenzhen, China.

Description
The main structure of the hotel is a winged 11 storey tower with 620 rooms and located on 15 Xin Yuan Road in the Lu Hu District of Shenzhen.
The hotel is a short distance (3 minutes by car) from the Hong Kong-China border at Lo Wu Control Point. The complex has 10 villas that provide more private accommodations for important guests.

Provisional Legislative Council of Hong Kong

One of the conference halls of the hotel housed the Provisional Legislative Council of Hong Kong from September 1996 to 27 January 1997.

Other Uses
Besides hosting the provisional Hong Kong Government, the hotel has hosted mainland government needs

Footnotes

See also

 Legislative Council Building

External links
 

Hotels in Shenzhen
Legislative buildings in China
Buildings and structures in Shenzhen